The Southern Gospel Music Association (SGMA) is a non-profit corporation formed as an association of southern gospel music singers, songwriters, fans, and industry workers. Membership is acquired and maintained through payment of annual dues. The SGMA was formed in 1994, and states that its primary goal is "to preserve, protect and promote Southern Gospel Music, its history and heritage".

The Southern Gospel Music Association operates the Southern Gospel Museum and Hall of Fame in Pigeon Forge, a popular Tennessee tourist town, and also hosts the Southern Gospel Music Awards. The Hall of Fame and Museum was opened at the Dollywood theme park in 1999.

Leadership of the SGMA is vested in a 23-member board of directors. The SGMA is responsible for the nomination, selection, and induction into the Southern Gospel Music Hall of Fame.

History
The Gospel Music Association (GMA) was founded in 1964 to promote Gospel music. It was created as an extension of the National Quartet Convention, a convention devoted to Southern gospel that had been operating since 1956. Its founding board included Don Butler, Cecil and James Blackwood, Vestal Goodman, Charlie Lamb, Don Light, and J.D. Sumner, and its first president was Tennessee Ernie Ford. In its early years, it faced competition from the United States Gospel Music Association, a for-profit entity also focused on gospel music.

In the 1970s and 1980s, tension and conflict emerged between Southern gospel and the newer developments of Jesus music and Contemporary Christian music. Southern Gospel conservatives had been resistant to racial integration, and even as they were slowly becoming more receptive to integration, the new developments in Christian music resulted in Southern Gospel becoming increasingly marginalized by music consumers and losing influence in the GMA. Many Southern conservatives, including members of the GMA, also disapproved of rock music and felt that the newer styles of Gospel music being promoted by the GMA indicated that the organization was essentially moving into an alliance with the "enemy". The Southern Gospel industry became disenchanted with the direction that the GMA was heading and a new organization, the Southern Gospel Music Association, was formed by Charles Waller. However, in 1985, this organization was absorbed by the GMA. A new, independent Southern Gospel Music Association was formed in 1995.

Southern Gospel Museum and Hall of Fame

The Southern Gospel Museum and Hall of Fame is a site operated at Dollywood, in Pigeon Forge, Tennessee, by the Southern Gospel Music Association. It was established in 1997. The Hall of Fame is composed of pioneers in the field of Southern gospel music; members are selected by the SGMA annually, and are honored by a descriptive plaque and portrait in the Hall itself. The Museum contains thousands of items of memorabilia and a gift shop. An animatronic quartet, sponsored by Bill Gaither, sings "Give the World a Smile." Other items on display include a replica of the Blackwood Brothers first bus, interactive video and sound clips, and bronze plaques of Hall of Fame inductees. It has been estimated that over one million people visit the facility annually.

Beginning in 2004, the Hall of Fame began holding their popular annual induction ceremonies. Dollywood closes its doors to the public, and the all-day event is filled with musical performances.

The Hall of Fame is currently under the leadership of Executive Director Charles Waller, who is also producer of the Grand Ole Gospel Reunion in Knoxville, Tennessee.

Inductees
A-L

Abernathy, Lee Roy (1997)
Abner, James Buford (2002)
Akers, Doris (2011)
Allred, Glennan "Glen" (2001)
Arnold, Robert Sterling (2005)
Bagwell, Wendy Lee (1997)
Bartlett, Eugene Monroe "E.M." (2000)
Baxter, Clarice Howard "Ma" (1997)
Baxter, Jesse Randall "J.R." (1997)
Bean, Peg McKamey (2016)
Bean, Ruben (2019)
Beasley, Lester George "Les" (1997)
Bennett, Roger (2007)
Benson Jr., John T. (2013)
Blackwood, Doyle (2011)
Blackwood, James Webre (1997)
Blackwood, R. W. (2002)
Brock, Dwight Moody (2003)
Brumley, Albert Edward (1997)
Brumley, Bob (2011)
Burger, Anthony (2007)
Burke, Charles (2012)
Burns, Troy (2017)
Carter, David Parker "Dad" (1997)
Carter, Roy (2011)
Cook, Martin Alfred (2003)
Copsey, Polly Lewis (2013)
Crumpler, Denver Dale (1997)
Daniel, Fred E. (2008)
Daniel, John Tyra (1997)
Davis, James Houston "Jimmie" (1997)
Davis, Anna Gordon (2005)
Derricks, Lister Cleavant (2001)
Dorsey, Thomas A. (2013)
Downing, Ann (2018)
Edwards, Wallace "Happy" (2006)
Ellis, Vesphew Benton (2001)
Enloe, Marvin Neil (2009)
Fagg, Elmo (2005)
Fowler, John Wallace "Wally" (1997)
Fox, Eldridge Locke "Foxy" (1998)
Gaither, William James "Bill" (1997)
Gaither, Danny (2010)
Gaither, Gloria Lee Sickal (2005)
Gates, Kenny (2011)
Gatlin, Earl Smith "Smitty" (1999)
Goff, Jerry (2002)
Goff, Little Jan Buckner (2010)
Goss, Lari (2016)
Goodman, Charles F. "Rusty" (1997)
Goodman, Howard (2003)
Goodman, Sam (2011)
Goodman, Vestal (2002)
Greene, Tony (2017)
Grimes, Polly (2008)
Hamblen, Stuart (2012)
Hall, Connor Brandon (1997)
Hamill, Jim (2004)
Harper, Herman Clay (1997)
Hefner, Bill (2010)
Heil, Paul (2014)
Hemphill, Joel (2007)
Hemphill, Labreeska (2017)
Hess, Jake (1997)
Hildreth, Lou Wills (2007)
Hill, Edwin Lee "Ed" (2009)
Hill, Jim (2012)
Hinson, Kenny (2004)
Hinson, Ronny (2016)
Hopper, Claude (2014)
Hopper, Connie (2010)
Hyles, Arnold (2004)
Hyles, Vernon (2005)
Jones, Bob Sr. (2006)
Jones, Jimmy (2007)
Karnes, Rose Carter (2006)
Key, Charles (2006)
Kirksey, Jerry (2011)
Klaudt, Lillian Little Soldier (2004)
Klaudt, Melvin (2020)
Lane, Jennings Harold (2009)
LeFevre, Alphus (2002)
LeFevre, Meurice (2020)
LeFevre, Eva Mae Whittington (1997)
LeFevre, Urias (1997)
Lester, Harvey Bryant (2004)
Lester, Herschel LuMeart (2008)
Lester, Opal (2011)
Lewis, James Roy "Pop" (2000)
Light, Don (2009)
Lister, Hovie Franklin (1997)
Lister, Thomas Mosie (1997)
Lyles, James William "Bill" (2009)

M-Z

Maples, Fred Calvin (2003)
McClung, John Alexander (2003)
McCoy, Otis Leon (2003)
Miller, Dottie Leonard (2020)
Morrison, Geraldine (2012)
Mull, Jacob Bazzel (2003)
Mull, Elizabeth "Lady" (2009)
Nelon, Rex Lloyd (1999)
Nicholson, Duane (2013)
Norcross, Benjamin Marvin (1997)
Nowlin, Wilmer Berney "W. B." (1997)
O'Neal, Ed (2004)
Orrell, Lloyd (1997)
Ott, Doy Willis (2000)
Pace, Adger McDavid (1999)
Parris, Conley "London" (2004)
Parris, Oren A. "O. A." (1997)
Parsons, Squire (2008)
Payne, Glen Weldon (1997)
Phillips, Ernie (2019)
Pittman, Jack Earl (2006)
Powell, Rosa Nell Speer (2005)
Presley, Luther G. (2008)
Rambo, Buck (2012)
Rambo, Dottie Luttrell (1997)
Ramsey, William Morgan (2002)
Reader, Naomi Sego (2001)
Reece, David (2007)
Reese, Ray Dean (2008)
Reid, Mary Tom Speer (2006)
Richman, Milton H. "Ace" (2012)
Riley, Tim (2013)
Rodeheaver, Homer Alvan (2003)
Roper, Joseph L. "Smilin' Joe" (2005)
Rozell, Roland Dwayne "Rosie" (1999)
Sego, James (2007)
Shaw, Edward Lamar "Bill" (2005)
Shelnut, Dale Lawrence (2001)
Shelnut, Randy (2017)
Showalter, Anthony Johnson "A.J." (2000)
Slater, Erman Clark (2005)
Slaughter, Henry Thaxton (2006)
Smith, Arthur (2010)
Snider, Marion B. (2003)
Speer, Ben Lacy (1998)
Speer, George Thomas "Dad" (1997)
Speer, Jackson Brock (1997)
Speer, Lena Brock "Mom" (1997)
Stamps, Frank Howard (1997)
Stamps, Virgil Oliver "V. O." (1997)
Stanphill, Ira Forest (2001)
Stewart, Derrell (2004)
Strickland, Bobby (2003)
Stuffle, Tracy (2018)
Sumner, John Daniel "J. D." (1997)
Templeton, Maurice (2006)
Todd, Carl Milton "Billy" (2009)
Toney, Jack (2005)
Trammell, Mark (2018)
Unseld, Benjamin Carl (2004)
Varner, Wallace B. "Wally" (2006)
Vaughan, Charles Wesley (2004)
Vaughan, Glenn Kieffer (1997)
Vaughan, James David (1997)
Waits, James Parks "Big Jim" (1997)
Walbert, James D. (2004)
Walbert, William Burton (1999)
Wallace, Ed F. "Eddie" (2005)
Waller, Charles Allen "Charlie" (2009)
Watkins, Archie (2007)
Weatherford, Earl Henderson (2000)
Weatherford, Lily Fern Goble (2000)
Wetherington, James Stephen "Big Chief" (1997)
Whitfield, Jesse Gillis "J. G." (1997)
Wilburn, Jackie (2019)
Wilkinson, Dianne (2020)
Williams, Gerald Don (2006)
Wilson, Norman (2018)
Winsett, Robert Emmett (2002)
Wolfe, Gerald (2019)
Wynn, Willie (2011)
Younce, George Wilson (1998)

James D. Vaughan Impact Award recipients
1999 Bill Gaither
2000 The Cathedrals
2001 James Blackwood
2002 J. G. Whitfield
2003 Les Beasley
2004 Paul Heil
2005 Mosie Lister
2006 Bob Brumley
2007 Eva Mae LeFevre
2008 Lari Goss
2009 Barbara Mandrell
2010 Dolly Parton
2011 The Statler Brothers
2012 The Oak Ridge Boys
2013 Louise Mandrell

Gallery

See also
 Gospel Music Association
 Gospel Music Hall of Fame

References

External links
sgma.org Official website

Southern gospel
Gospel music associations
Privately held companies based in Tennessee
Music organizations based in the United States